Warburton railway station is located in the Nankana Sahib Tehsil, Sheikhupura District, Pakistan.

See also
 List of railway stations in Pakistan
 Pakistan Railways

References

External links

Railway stations in Nankana Sahib District
Railway stations on Shorkot–Sheikhupura line